The Omega BS-12 was a utility helicopter with high ground clearance designed to carry loads behind the cabin at, or near, the center of gravity.

Design & development
Bernard Sznycer, designer of the Sznycer SG-VI, the first helicopter certified in Canada, set up the Omega Aircraft Corporation, based at New Bedford, Massachusetts in December 1953, with himself as President and Chief Designer of the company. Omega's first design was a twin-engined flying crane / utility helicopter, intended to be inexpensive to produce and relatively cheap to operate. 

The helicopter was of conventional layout, with a single four-bladed lift rotor and a two bladed anti-torque rotor. Its fuselage was of pod-and-boom layout, with a small enclosed crew cabin forward connected to an uncovered steel tube tail boom. Cargo, either a slung load or in a pre-loaded pod, could be carried between the crew cabin and the undercarriage mainwheels, while it was planned to also provide a pod to carry passengers. It was powered by twin piston engines mounted horizontally on either side of the main gearbox.

Operational history
The first example made its maiden flight on December 29, 1956. The type was certified by the Federal Aviation Administration in April 1961. Omega planned to build an initial batch of 25 BS-12-D-1s, which were priced at $77,500, with production gradually building up from one per month. Although Omega received orders for several BS-12s following certification, shortages of funds stopped production, and Omega entered into bankruptcy in July 1962. Omega was purchased by the Aeronautical Research and Development Corporation of Boston, Massachusetts, with the intention of putting the BS-12 into production as the ADRC/Omega RD-400.

Variants
BS-12Initial prototype powered by 2x  Franklin 6AS-335 engines, one built (c/n 156).
BS-12BRevised BS-12, one built (c/n 1001).
BS-12D-1 Five-seat passenger cabin, powered by 2x  Lycoming O-540-F1B5 engines, two built  (c/n 1002 & 1003).
BS-12D-3The second BS-12D-1 powered by 2x supercharged Franklin 6AS-335 engines.
BS-12FProjected turboshaft powered version, 2x Allison T63 or Boeing 502-W turbines.
BS-12JProjected improved hot-high and single-engined performance, powered by 2x  Lycoming IO-540 engines.
BS-14 FalconProjected emergency services version, with longer cabin, powered by 2x  Lycoming O-540 or  Lycoming IO-540 engines.
BS-17A Airliner Projected enlarged passenger cabin version to have been powered by 3x Allison or Boeing turboshaft engines driving a 5-bladed main rotor.
ARDC/Omega RP-400 Planned production version for ARDC. Powered by two  Lycoming IO-540s.
ARDC/Omega TP-900 Proposed advanced derivate of RP-400, powered by three turboshaft engines.

Specifications (BS-12D1)

See also

References

 

1950s United States helicopters
Twin-engined piston helicopters
Aircraft first flown in 1956